1957 Országos Bajnokság I (men's water polo) was the 51st water polo championship in Hungary. There were ten teams who played one-round match for the title.

Final list 

*M - Matches; W - Win; D - Drawn; L - Lost G+ - Goals earned; G- - Goals got; Diff - Difference; P - Point

2. Class 
1. UTTE 29, 2. BVTSE 27, 3. Tatabányai Bányász 21(1), 4. Szolnoki Honvéd 21, 5. Szentes 17, 6. Csepel Autó 15, 7. Kistext 14, 8. Bp. Gyárépítők 13, 9. Tipográfia 12, 10. Óbudai Hajógyár 9(1) point. In parentheses were the conclusion penalty points.

Sources 
Gyarmati Dezső: Aranykor (Hérodotosz Könyvkiadó és Értékesítő Bt., Budapest, 2002.)

1957 in water polo
1957 in Hungarian sport
Seasons in Hungarian water polo competitions